Tom Green (born 23 January 2001) is a professional Australian rules footballer playing for the Greater Western Sydney Giants in the Australian Football League (AFL).

Early life
Green was born in Townsville, Queensland and spent the first decade of his life regularly relocating between Townsville, Toowoomba, Darwin, Melbourne and Tamworth due to his father's Army commitments. In year 6, he settled in Canberra where he tried an array of sports which included Australian rules football, basketball, cricket and rugby union. Green became a member of the GIANTS Academy at the age of 12 and worked his way through the local junior ranks to become an outstanding prospect in his age group. He received NAB Under-18 All Australian selection in his final year of junior football and was also nominated for the 2019 NEAFL Rising Star Award.

His grandfather, Michael, is a four-time premiership player with the Richmond Tigers and is a member of Richmond's Team of the 20th Century. While growing up in Canberra, Tom attended school at Marist College Canberra.

Family
Tom Green has a family of 6, being one of 4 brothers. Lachlan Green, William Green and Josh Green. Tom's mother is Melanie and his Father Richard is in the Australian Army.

AFL career
 used their No. 10 pick in the 2019 national draft to recruit Green, after Carlton made a bid for him. As Green was a member of the Giants Academy, they were able to match the bid. He made his AFL debut in round 1 of the 2020 AFL season.

Green is a promising young player for the GWS Giants, having a breakthrough season in 2021, including being nominated for the 2021 AFL Rising Star in Round 9.

Statistics
''Statistics are correct to the end of the 2021 season'

|- style=background:#EAEAEA
| scope=row | 2020 || 
| 12 || 6 || 1 || 3 || 31 || 60 || 91 || 15 || 14 || 0.2 || 0.5 || 5.2 || 10.0 || 15.2 || 2.5 || 2.3 || 0
|-
| scope=row | 2021 ||  
| 12 || 18 || 7 || 6 || 139 || 221 || 360 || 55 || 53 || 0.4 || 0.3 || 7.7 || 12.3 || 20.0 || 3.1 || 2.9 || 
|- style="background:#EAEAEA; font-weight:bold; width:2em"
| scope="row" text-align:center class="sortbottom" colspan=3 | Career
| 24
| 8
| 9
| 170
| 281
| 451
| 70
| 67
| 0.3
| 0.4
| 7.1
| 11.7
| 18.8
| 2.9
| 2.8
| 0
|}

Notes

References

External links

2001 births
Living people
Greater Western Sydney Giants players
Sportspeople from Townsville
Sportspeople from Canberra
Australian rules footballers from the Australian Capital Territory
Australian rules footballers from Queensland